The Explorers program is a NASA exploration program that provides flight opportunities for physics, geophysics, heliophysics, and astrophysics investigations from space. Launched in 1958, Explorer 1 was the first spacecraft of the United States to achieve orbit. Over 90 space missions have been launched since. Starting with Explorer 6, it has been operated by NASA, with regular collaboration with a variety of other institutions, including many international partners.

Launchers for the Explorer program have included Juno I, Juno II, various Thor, Scout, Delta and Pegasus launch vehicles, and Falcon 9.

The program has three classes: Medium-Class Explorers (MIDEX), Small Explorers (SMEX), and University-Class Explorers (UNEX), with select Missions of Opportunity operated with other agencies.

History

Early Explorer satellites 

The Explorer program began as a U.S. Army proposal (Project Orbiter) to place a "civilian" artificial satellite into orbit during the International Geophysical Year (IGY). Although that proposal was rejected in favor of the U.S. Navy's Project Vanguard, which made the first sub-orbital flight Vanguard TV0 in December 1956, the Soviet Union's launch of Sputnik 1 on 4 October 1957 (and the resulting "Sputnik crisis") and the failure of the Vanguard 1 launch attempt resulted in the Army program being funded to match the Soviet space achievements. Explorer 1 was launched on the Juno I on 1 February 1958, becoming the first U.S. satellite, as well as discovering the Van Allen radiation belt.

Four follow-up satellites of the Explorer series were launched by the Juno I launch vehicle in 1958, of which Explorer 3 and Explorer 4 were successful, while Explorer 2 and Explorer 5 failed to reach orbit. The Juno I vehicle was replaced by the Juno II in 1959.

Continuation of the Explorer program 

With the establishment of NASA in 1958, the Explorer program was transferred to NASA from the U.S. Army. NASA continued to use the name for an ongoing series of relatively small space missions, typically an artificial satellite with a specific science focus. Explorer 6 in 1959 was the first scientific satellite under the project direction of NASA's Goddard Space Flight Center (GSFC) in Greenbelt, Maryland.

The Interplanetary Monitoring Platform (IMP) was launched in 1963, and involved a network of eleven Explorer satellites designed to collect data on space radiation in support of the Apollo program. The IMP program was a major step forward in spacecraft electronics design, as it was the first space program to use integrated circuit (IC) chips and MOSFETs (MOS transistors). The IMP-A (Explorer 18) in 1963 was the first spacecraft to use IC chips, and the IMP-D (Explorer 33) in 1966 was the first to use MOSFETs.

Over the following two decades, NASA has launched over 50 Explorer missions, some in conjunction to military programs, usually of an exploratory or survey nature or had specific objectives not requiring the capabilities of a major space observatory. Explorer satellites have made many important discoveries on: Earth's magnetosphere and the shape of its gravity field; the solar wind; properties of micrometeoroids raining down on the Earth; ultraviolet, cosmic and X-rays from the Solar System and beyond; ionospheric physics; Solar plasma; solar energetic particles; and atmospheric physics. These missions have also investigated air density, radio astronomy, geodesy, and gamma-ray astronomy.

With drops in NASA's budget, Explorer missions became infrequent in the early 1980s.

SMEX, MIDEX, and Student Explorer programs 
In 1988, the Small Explorer (SMEX) class was established with a focus on frequent flight opportunities for highly focused and relatively inexpensive space science missions in the disciplines of astrophysics and space physics. The first three SMEX missions were chosen in April 1989 out of 51 candidates, and launched in 1992, 1996 and 1998 The second set of two missions were announced in September 1994 and launched in 1998 and 1999.

In the mid 1990s, NASA initiated the Medium-class Explorer (MIDEX) to enable more frequent flights. These are larger than SMEX missions and were to be launched aboard a new kind of medium-light class launch vehicle. This new launch vehicle was not developed and instead, these missions were flown on a modified Delta II rocket. The first announcement opportunity for MIDEX was issued in March 1995, and the first launch under this new class was FUSE in 1999.

In May 1994, NASA started the Student Explorer Demonstration Initiative (STEDI) pilot program, to demonstrate that high-quality space science can be carried out with small, low-cost missions. Of the three selected missions, SNOE was launched in 1998 and TERRIERS in 1999, but the latter failed after launch. The STEDI program was terminated in 2001. Later, NASA established the University-Class Explorer (UNEX) program for much cheaper missions, which is regarded as a successor to STEDI.

The Explorer missions were at first managed by the Small Explorer Project Office at NASA's Goddard Space Flight Center (GSFC). In early 1999, that office was closed and with the announcement of opportunity for the third set of SMEX missions NASA converted the SMEX class so that each mission was managed by its principal investigator, with oversight by the GSFC Explorer Project. The Explorer program Office at Goddard Space Flight Center, provides management of the many operational scientific exploration missions that are characterized by relatively moderate costs and small to medium-sized missions that are capable of being built, tested, and launched in a short time interval compared to larger observatories like NASA's Great Observatories.

Excluding the launches, the MIDEX class has a current mission cap cost of US$250 million in 2018, with future MIDEX missions being capped at US$350 million. The cost cap for SMEX missions in 2017 was US$165 million. UNEX missions are capped at US$15 million. A sub-project called Missions of Opportunity (MO) has funded science instruments or hardware components of onboard non-NASA space missions, and have a total NASA cost cap of US$70 million.

Classes

Medium-Class Explorers (MIDEX)

Small Explorers (SMEX)
The missions are managed by the Explorers Project at the Goddard Space Flight Center (GSFC).

The first set of three SMEX missions were launched between 1992 and 1998. The second set of two missions were launched in 1998 and 1999. These early missions were managed by the Small Explorer Project Office at Goddard Space Flight Center. In early 1999, that office was closed and with the announcement of opportunity for the third set of SMEX missions NASA converted the program so that each mission was managed by its Principal Investigator, with oversight by the GSFC Explorers Project.

NASA funded a competitive study of five candidate heliophysics Small Explorers missions for flight in 2022. The proposals were Mechanisms of Energetic Mass Ejection – eXplorer (MEME-X), Focusing Optics X-ray Solar Imager (FOXSI), Multi-Slit Solar Explorer (MUSE), Tandem Reconnection and Cusp Electrodynamics Reconnaissance Satellites (TRACERS), and Polarimeter to Unify the Corona and Heliosphere (PUNCH). In June 2019 NASA selected TRACERS and PUNCH for flight.

University-Class Explorers (UNEX)

Missions of Opportunity (MO)
Missions of Opportunity (MO) are investigations characterized by being part of a non-NASA space mission of any size and having a total NASA cost of under $55 million. These missions are conducted on a no-exchange-of-funds basis with the organization sponsoring the mission. NASA solicits proposals for Missions of Opportunity on SMEX, MIDEX and UNEX investigations.

Beacon Explorers
Three satellites were planned in this series: Beacon Explorer-A, Beacon Explorer-B, Beacon Explorer-C.

GEOS series
A series of three Geodetic Earth Orbiting Satellite (GEOS) were put in orbit: GEOS 1, GEOS 2, GEOS 3.

Launched spacecraft 

Explorer name numbers can be found in the NSSDC master catalog, typically assigned to each spacecraft in a mission. These numbers were not officially assigned until after 1975.

Cancelled missions

Many missions are proposed, but not selected. For example, in 2011, the Explorers Program received 22 full missions solicitations, 20 Missions of Opportunity, and 8 USPI. Sometimes mission are only partially developed but must be stopped for financial, technological, or bureaucratic reasons. Some missions failed upon reaching orbit including WIRE and TERRIERS.

Examples of missions that were not developed or cancelled were:
Owl 1 and 2 (cost, 1965)
MSS A (Magnetic Storm Satellite, Explorer-A, 1970)
CATSAT (STEDI 3) (cost)
IMEX (UNEX 2) (cost)
FAME (MIDEX 4)
SPIDR (SMEX 8) (technical, 2003)
GEMS (SMEX 13)

Recent examples of conclusions of launched missions, cancelled due to budgetary constraints:
FAST - 2009
TRACE - 2010 (Solar observatory, see Solar Dynamics Observatory)
Wilkinson MAP - 2010
WISE - 2011 (extended in 2013 as NEOWISE mission)
RXTE - 2012
Galaxy Evolution Explorer - 2013

Launch statistics
Number of launches per decade:

See also 

 Cosmic Vision, a European Space Agency (ESA) programme 
 Cosmic Vision S-class missions, the European Space Agency equivalent to the Small Explorer program
 Discovery program
 New Frontiers program

References

External links

 NASA Explorers Program missions page
 NSSDC updated list of Explorers missions
 Explorers Program Profile by NASA's Solar System Exploration
 Small Explorers Missions by Goddard Space Flight Center
 SMEX-series satellites by Colorado State University

NASA programs